This is a list of films with settings beyond the date they were released or made, even if that setting is now in the past, and films with a futuristic setting despite having an unspecified (unspec.) date. It also includes films that are only partially set in the future.

Films

See also

 List of stories set in a future now in the past

Notes

References

Future
 
Retrofuturism